The Baltic Cup Open  was a darts tournament that was held between 2009 and 2016.

List of tournaments

Men's

Women's

Tournament records
 Most wins 2: .  Arūnas Čiplys, 
 Most Finals 4:  Arūnas Čiplys
 Most Semi Finals 5:  Arūnas Čiplys
 Most Quarter Finals 6:  Arūnas Čiplys
 Most Appearances 7:  Arūnas Čiplys
 Youngest Winner age 18:  Rowby-John Rodriguez
 Oldest Winner age 41:

See also
List of BDO ranked tournaments
List of WDF tournaments

References

External links
Estonia Darts Organization

2009 establishments in Estonia
2016 disestablishments in Estonia
Darts tournaments